John Stuart David Moffat (born 18 August 1977 in Edinburgh) is a former Scottish rugby union international. He also played a first-class cricket match for Cambridge University.

Rugby Union career

Amateur career

Moffat played for Edinburgh and Cambridge University, for whom he made two appearances in The Varsity Match against Oxford while studying as a postgraduate student.

Professional career

He has played for various clubs during his career including Castres in France, Viadana in Italy and Scottish professional district sides Glasgow Warriors and Border Reivers.

International career

Moffat made his Test debut in a match against Romania at Murrayfield in November 2002 and scored a try from full-back in a 27-point win. He played two further Tests in the same stadium that month, with Scotland defeating both South Africa and Fiji. Moffat's only other cap came two years later, again at Murrayfield, when Australia defeated Scotland by 31 points to 14 to claim the Hopetoun Cup.

He has played for various clubs during his career including Castres in France, Viadana in Italy and Scottish teams Borders and Edinburgh.

Cricket career

Club career

His first-class cricket appearance was made in the 2002 University Match, against Oxford University. Moffat brought up a century off just 103 balls and had amassed 169 by the time Benjamin Vonwiller trapped him leg before wicket. It was the highest score by a cricketer playing their first match for Cambridge University since Test batsman Hubert Doggart made a double hundred in 1948. As Moffat did not bat again, either in that match or at first-class level, Moffat's career average remained 169.

International career

His performance was a contrast to his earlier efforts in 1997, when he scored ducks in two limited overs matches for a Scotland XI against Durham. He had also represented Scotland at Under-19 level.

References

External links
Cricinfo: Stuart Moffat
Scrum: Stuart Moffat

See also
 List of Scottish cricket and rugby union players

1977 births
Living people
Scottish cricketers
Cambridge University cricketers
Scottish rugby union players
Scotland international rugby union players
Edinburgh Academicals rugby union players
Glasgow Warriors players
Border Reivers players
Cambridge R.U.F.C. players
Rugby union fullbacks
Alumni of St Edmund's College, Cambridge